Keratin 20, often abbreviated CK20, is a protein that in humans is encoded by the KRT20 gene.

Keratin 20 is a type I cytokeratin. It is a major cellular protein of mature enterocytes and goblet cells and is specifically found in the gastric and intestinal mucosa.

In immunohistochemistry, antibodies to CK20 can be used to identify a range of adenocarcinoma arising from epithelia that normally contain the CK20 protein. For example, the protein is commonly found in colorectal cancer, transitional cell carcinomas and in  Merkel cell carcinoma, but is absent in lung cancer, prostate cancer, and non-mucinous ovarian cancer. It is often used in combination with antibodies to CK7 to distinguish different types of glandular tumour.

References

Further reading

Keratins